Grave Robbers from Outer Space (GROS) is a card game designed by Stephen Tassie and published by Z-Man Games.  GROS parodies movies and movie clichés, especially those from science fiction and horror movies. It is played with a specially designed 120 card deck.

The idea of the game is to create a movie (made up of a location and characters, and to characters holding props). Each of these cards has a "defense strength" (DS) between +10 and −15. The sum of the values on a player's cards is the defense of their movie. The goal is to have the strongest movie (i.e. the one with the highest defense) when either there are no cards left to draw, or one of two cards with the words "Roll The Credits" is played.

The Cards 
Each card contains the following information:
A name ("The Babysitter", "Wrong Side of the Gorge")
A picture (Special Effect cards do not have pictures on them)
A quote ("Why should I believe your story, kid ... say, is that a tentacle?")
Traits (Not all cards have traits)
Special rules for the card
A title word or words ("In 3D", "Sinister")

Each card is in one of five colors:
Green - locations ("The Mall", "Tokyo Skyline")
Blue - characters ("The Military Officer", "Skippy the Wonder Dog")
Orange - props ("The Flashlight", "The Hat")
Red - creatures ("Lava Men", "The Gym Teacher")
Yellow - special effects

The two "Roll The Credits" cards are all black with the words in large red letters in the center.

Rules 
At the beginning of the game, six cards are drawn at random from the deck. From the title words, which appear at the bottom of the card, a title for the game is created. At the end of the game, each player receives five bonus points for each word that appears both in their movie and in the game title. Many players choose not to play with this rule, and skip this phase.

Each player is dealt a hand of six cards. If a player has no characters in their initial hand, they return their hand to the draw pile and draw a fresh hand, continuing to do so until they have at least one character in their hand.

Once all players have put out their characters, play begins.

Any time a card is played, its quote is read, otherwise it is not in play.

On a turn, the player fills their hand to six cards. They may then play as many cards as they like, with three restrictions:
They cannot affect other players' movies in the first round.
They cannot "roll the credits" in the first two rounds.
They can put out as many props as they have characters, giving one prop to each of their characters on their turn.

The player may take a prop from one character and give it to a second character, this counting as the prop that the second character is given this turn.

Players are allowed to change not only their location, but any other player's location.

The Defense Strength (DS) of one's movie is equal to the sum of the point value of their location, their characters, their props and any special rules that will add to these point values. For example, certain special effect cards give bonuses to a character or to a prop, and certain cards affect other cards. For example, the Nymphomaniac Cheerleader gives a bonus of +1 to all characters with the trait Male in the same movie.

Players attack other players' movies using creature cards. Each creature has an "attack strength" (AS). If a creature's AS is greater than or equal to the movie's DS, then the player who played the creature gets to choose one of the characters to die (i.e. go to the discard pile with all of its props).

Special Effects cards can be played at any time, during any player's turn. One simply reads the quote and applies the effect. These can change the outcome of an attack either way, or can do all sorts of different things.

After the player has played any and all the cards they want to, they may also choose to discard any number of cards. Play then passes to the next player.

The game is over when either there are no cards left in the draw pile, or someone plays a "Roll the Credits" card. The person who wins is the person with the highest DS at that time.

Additional games 
There are nine other similar versions of the game. Each can be played on its own, or can be combined with the others.

The other games are:
Cannibal Pygmies in the Jungles of Doom (action and adventure movies)
Kung Fu Samurai on Giant Robot Island (Asian cinema, including anime)
Grave Robbers II: Skippy's Revenge (more sci-fi and horror)
Bell Bottomed Badasses on the Mean Streets of Funk ('70s and blaxploitation movies)
Berserker Halflings from the Dungeons of Dragons (fantasy movies)
The Scurvy Musketeers of the Spanish Main (swashbuckling/pirate movies)
Bushwhackin' Varmints Out Of Sergio's Butte (Western (genre) movies)
Silent But Deadly Night (Christmas movies)
Grave Robbers III: Suburban Slashers from Sunnydale Street (even more sci-fi and horror)

Some of the games have a slightly different rule as to the circumstances when a "Roll the Credits" card may be played. Other than that, the games all use the same rules of play.

Reviews
Pyramid

References

External links
Z-Man Games webpage

Card games introduced in 2001
Dedicated deck card games
Z-Man Games games